The Flight of Socrates (Italian:La fuga di Socrate) is a 1923 Italian silent film directed by Guido Brignone and starring Carlo Aldini.

Plot
Ajax accidentily startles Socrates, the pet parrot of his fiancé Annita, causing him to fly away through an open window. Annita says she will not marry Ajax until he returns Socrates to her. In his international search for the parrot, Ajax accidentally becomes a wanted man everywhere he goes. Socrates eventually is released to return home by his new owners, Liliana and her father, much to Annita's delight. While Socrates returns home, Ajax does not, because he finds the love of his life, Liliana, while searching for Socrates. The film ends with Annita’s parents scolding her for abusing Ajax’s love.

Cast
 Carlo Aldini - Ajax (Aiace)
 Ruy Vismara - Annita
 Vasco Creti - Liliana's father
 Giuseppe Brignone - Annita's father
 Miss Rolfo - Liliana

References

Bibliography
 Stewart, John. Italian Film: A Who's Who, McFarland, 1994.

External links

1923 films
1920s Italian-language films
Films directed by Guido Brignone
Italian silent feature films
Italian black-and-white films